Oldham Glodwick Road railway station was one of five stations that served the town of Oldham. It was close to Oldham Mumps railway station, but was on a different line.

History

It replaced the LNWR's original terminus at Oldham Mumps which closed the same day.

The station closed on 2 May 1955, when the Delph Donkey passenger train service to  via Greenfield was withdrawn. The line remained open for goods traffic until 1964.

References

An Illustrated History of Oldham's Railways by John Hooper

External links
Oldham Glodwick Road Station on navigable 1948 O.S. map

Disused railway stations in the Metropolitan Borough of Oldham
Former London and North Western Railway stations
Railway stations in Great Britain opened in 1862
Railway stations in Great Britain closed in 1955
1862 establishments in England
1955 disestablishments in England